Bread and Roses is a political slogan originally associated with the 1912 textile strike in Lawrence, Massachusetts.

Bread and Roses may also refer to:

Bread and Roses (1967 film), a 1967 East German film
Bread and Roses (1993 film), a 1993 biographical film about the New Zealand trade unionist Sonja Davies
Bread and Roses (2000 film), a 2000 film about custodial workers in Los Angeles
Bread and Roses (album), a 1976 album by Judy Collins
Bread and Roses (band), a band from Boston, Massachusetts
Bread and Roses (collective), a women's liberation collective based in Boston, Massachusetts
Bread and Roses (magazine), a magazine for British and Irish members of the Industrial Workers of the World
Bread and Roses (political party), a United States political party based in the state of Maryland 
Bread and Roses Award, a British award for radical books
Bread and Roses Heritage Festival, an annual labor history and social justice festival in Lawrence, Massachusetts
Bread and Roses Presents, an entertainment nonprofit organization associated with Mimi Fariña and based in San Francisco
Bread and Roses TV, weekly bilingual TV/YouTube show produced by the Council of Ex-Muslims of Britain
Bread and Roses: Her Story, an autobiography of the New Zealand trade unionist Sonja Davies